Giuliana Calandra  (10 February 1936 – 25 November 2018) was an Italian film, television and stage actress, journalist and television hostess.

Life and career
Born in Moncalieri, Giuliana Calandra debuted in 1963 Pier Paolo Pasolini's La ricotta and appearing in hundreds of films, TV-series and stage works, including works by Dario Argento, Marco Ferreri, Alberto Sordi, Lina Wertmüller, Giorgio Albertazzi, Mario Monicelli, Costa-Gavras, Dino Risi, Sergio Corbucci, Alberto Lattuada.

In the 1980s she started a parallel career as journalist and TV-author/presenter, mainly focusing on fashion and entertainment.

Calandra died in Aprilia on 25 November 2018, at the age of 82.

Selected filmography 

 La calandria (1972) - Venegonda
 Love and Anarchy (1973)
 Story of a Cloistered Nun (1973)
 All Screwed Up (1974) - Biki
 The Beast (1974) - Amalia
 Terminal (1974)
 La nottata (1975)
 Deep Red (1975) - Amanda Righetti
 Convoy Buddies (1975) - Rosy
 Di che segno sei? (1975) - Maria Bompazzi
 Go Gorilla Go (1975) - Mrs. Sampioni
 The Last Woman (1976) - Benoite
 Giovannino (1976)
 Caro Michele (1976) - Ada
 Hit Squad (1976) - Tenente Adele Ciampini
 La segretaria privata di mio padre (1976) - Ersilia Ponziani
 Ecco noi per esempio (1977) - Beatrice
 Il... Belpaese (1977) - Elena
 Grand hôtel des palmes (1977)
 Difficile morire (1977)
 Nest of Vipers (1978) - Teacher
 Stay as You Are (1978) - Teresa
 Quando c'era lui... caro lei! (1978) - Queen of Italy
 C'est dingue... mais on y va (1979) - Doris Castagnet
 Womanlight (1979)
 L'affittacamere (1979) - Adele Bazziconi - wife of Settebeni
 Il corpo della ragassa (1979) - Laura Marengo
 Il lupo e l'agnello (1980) - Signora De Luca
 Il turno (1981) - Rosa
 My Darling, My Dearest (1982) - Zuava
 Sesso e volentieri (1982) - Giuliana
 Dio li fa poi li accoppia (1982) - Clara - don Celeste's housekeeper
 In viaggio con papà (1982) - Rita Canegatti
 Occhio nero, occhio biondo e occhio felino (1983)
 Petomaniac (1983) - Giulia
 Arrivano i miei (1983)
 Jocks (1984) - Old singer
 A Proper Scandal (1984) - Maria Gastaldelli
 Trainer on the Beach (1984) - Mara Canà
 A tu per tu (1984) - Patrizia
 Desiring Julia (1986)
 Rimini Rimini (1987) - Jerry's Wife
 Regina (1987) - Lella
 Il coraggio di parlare (1987) - Furios woman
 The Belt (1989) - Bianca's Mother
 Faccione (1991)
 Non chiamarmi Omar (1992)
 Signorina Giulia (1992) - Zia Graziella
 Our Tropical Island (2001) - Mrs. Tacchini
 Per finta e per amore (2002)
 Adored (2003) - Franca Soldani (uncredited)
 L'allenatore nel pallone 2 (2008) - Mara Canà (final film role)

References

External links 

 

1936 births
2018 deaths
Italian film actresses
Italian television presenters
Italian television journalists
Italian television actresses
Italian stage actresses
People from Moncalieri
20th-century Italian actresses
Women television journalists
Italian women journalists
Italian women television presenters